Mildred Weston Rogers (May 1892 - February 6, 1975) was an American author and composer who is best known for her piano compositions published by the Arthur P. Schmidt Company (now Summy Birchard) under her birth name "Weston." She was born in Gallitzin, Pennsylvania, to William and Anna Weston. Weston graduated from the Pennsylvania College for Women (now Chatham University) in Pittsburgh and the New England Conservatory of Music. After college, she taught music at Simonson's School and married William G. Rogers on December 6, 1933.

Weston wrote prose as well as music.

Selected works
Her works include:

Piano 

At the Zoo (1923)
In an Apple Orchard (seven piece suite)
Sandman (1952)
Toys: A Suite for the Piano (1923)
Under an April Sky (seven piece suite)
Under the Christmas Tree (a collection of 14 pieces; 1922)

Prose 
Carnival Crossroads: The Story of Times Square (with William G. Rogers)
music criticism for New Yorker magazine (1945)

Vocal 

Carol to the Child (1971)
Holy Family Carol (SATB; 1941)

References 

1892 births
1975 deaths
American women composers
American writers
American women writers
20th-century American women
New England Conservatory alumni